"An Adventure in Color/Mathmagicland" is the first color episode of Disney's long-running anthology series to air in color. It premiered on September 24, 1961, as Walt Disney's Wonderful World of Color following the series' move from ABC to NBC. This show introduced a new character, Ludwig Von Drake, who provides an interesting lowdown on color (at one point performing "The Spectrum Song", all about different colors). By the end of the song, the NBC Peacock makes a brief cameo as a "color show-off". The kaleidoscopic intro to the show featured music composed by Richard M. Sherman and Robert B. Sherman. The second part of the show is the 1959 featurette Donald in Mathmagic Land.

The episode was partially created to help promote color televisions.

Cast
Walt Disney - Himself
Paul Frees/Corey Burton (voice) - Ludwig Von Drake; the True Spirit of Adventure (also archive footage)
Clarence Nash (voice) - Donald Duck (archive footage)

Credits
Disney's Sing Along Songs Fun With Music Clips courtesy of Walt Disney Home Video.

References

External links
 

Walt Disney anthology television series episodes
Donald Duck
1961 American television episodes
Television episodes directed by Hamilton Luske